American singer Jennifer Lopez has released eight studio albums, one remix album, three compilation albums, one soundtrack, one extended play, 65 singles (including 14 as a featured artist), five charity singles and 12 promotional singles. As of 2022, the singer has sold more than 80 million records with 15 billion streams worldwide. She made her chart debut in May 1999 with "If You Had My Love", which topped the charts in six countries, including the United States. It was followed by the release of her debut studio album, On the 6 (1999), which reached the top five in several countries and produced four additional singles, including the international hit "Waiting for Tonight". The simultaneous release of her second studio album, J.Lo, and the film, The Wedding Planner, in January 2001, made Lopez the first entertainer to have a number one film and album in the United States in the same week. The album was certified four-times platinum in the United States and yielded four hit singles, including "Love Don't Cost a Thing" and "I'm Real", which peaked at number one on the Billboard Hot 100. The following year saw the release of Lopez's remix album, J to tha L–O! The Remixes (2002), which became the first remix album in history to debut at number one on the Billboard 200, and went on to become one of the best selling remix albums of all time. Three singles were released from the album, including "Ain't It Funny (Murder Remix)", which topped the Billboard Hot 100 for six consecutive weeks.

Lopez's third studio album, This Is Me... Then (2002), reached number two on the Billboard 200, and earned double-platinum status in the United States. Four singles were released from the album, including the hits "Jenny from the Block" and "All I Have", which topped the charts in the United States and New Zealand. Her fourth studio album, Rebirth (2005), charted moderately in the United States, eventually earning a platinum certification. It produced two singles, including its lead single, "Get Right", which went number one in five countries. Lopez's first full-length Spanish album, Como Ama una Mujer, was released in March 2007 and peaked at number ten on the US Billboard 200. Two singles were released from the album, most notably "Qué Hiciste", which was an international success and was certified eight-times platinum in Spain. A little over six months later, the singer released her sixth studio album, Brave (2007), which became her first album to miss the top ten on the Billboard 200. Just like the album, its lead single, "Do It Well", was only a moderate success.

Following a move to Island Records from Sony Music, Lopez released her seventh studio album, Love?, in May 2011. Three singles were released from the album, including "On the Floor", which became the singer's most successful single in her career. The song topped more than eighteen national charts and sold more than 8.4 million digital copies globally, making it the best-selling single of 2011 by a female artist. Lopez's first greatest hits album, Dance Again... the Hits (2012), followed a year later and produced the international hit "Dance Again". Her eighth studio album, A.K.A., was released in June 2014 by Capitol Records. Three singles were released from the album, including "Booty", which reached the top 20 in Canada and the United States. Since her return to Sony Music in 2016, Lopez has focused on releasing non-album singles in both English and Spanish, most notably "Ain't Your Mama", "El Anillo", "Dinero", "Pa' Ti" and "Cambia el Paso". In 2022, in collaboration with Maluma, she released a movie soundtrack.

Albums

Studio albums

Remix albums

Soundtrack albums

Compilation albums

Extended plays

Singles

1990s–2000s

2010s

2020s

Charity singles

Promotional singles

Guest appearances

Notes

References 

Discographies of American artists
Latin pop music discographies
Rhythm and blues discographies
Works by Jennifer Lopez